White cut chicken or white sliced chicken  is a type of siu mei. Unlike most other meats in the siu mei category, this particular dish is not roasted, but steamed. The dish is common to the cultures of Southern China, including Guangdong, Fujian and Hong Kong.

Preparation
The chicken is salt-marinated and cooked in its entirety in either plain in hot water or chicken broth with ginger. Other variations season the cooking liquid with additional ingredients, such as the white part of the green onion, cilantro stems or star anise. When the water starts to boil, the heat is turned off, allowing the chicken to cook in the residual heat for around 30 minutes. The chicken's skin will remain nearly white in color, and the meat will be quite tender and juicy. The dish can be served "rare", in which the meat is cooked thoroughly but a pinkish dark red blood is secreted from the bones. This is a more traditional version of white cut chicken that is seldom served in Chinese restaurants anymore. The chicken is usually cooled before cutting into pieces.

The chicken is served in pieces, with the skin and bone, sometimes garnished with cilantro, leeks and/or a slice of ginger. It is usually accompanied by a condiment called geung yung made by combining finely minced ginger, finely minced garlic, green onion, salt and hot oil. Additional dips can be spicy mustard, hoisin sauce, soy sauce, oyster sauce or chili pepper sauce.

See also
 Crispy fried chicken
 Fried chicken
 Hainanese chicken rice
 List of chicken dishes

References

Cantonese cuisine
Hong Kong cuisine
Malaysian cuisine
Chinese chicken dishes